The School of Criticism and Theory, now at Cornell University, is a summer program (offered in six-week seminars) in social science and literature. It is one of the most influential such programs in the United States to propagate the new dominant stream of "literary-critical-cultural 'theory'." The school was co-founded in 1976 by Murray Krieger, a prominent New Critic, at the University of California, Irvine, and has previously been housed at Northwestern University and Dartmouth College. In 2011, Cornell hosted it for the thirteenth time. In 2002, it was directed by Dominick LaCapra.

Notable seminar leaders
Amanda Anderson
Rey Chow
Stanley Fish
Michael Riffaterre
Edward Said
Barbara Herrnstein Smith
Hayden White

References

External links
School of Criticism and Theory

Cornell University
Colleges and schools of Cornell University
1976 establishments in New York (state)